Ciaran Kilheeney (born 9 January 1984) is an English footballer, who plays for Droylsden.

Career
After stints at Exeter City in the Football League and Mossley, the former Manchester City trainee joined Burscough from Ashton United. He scored 20 goals to help the Linnets to promotion in 2007, before finishing joint top marksman in the Conference North the following season.

In July 2010, Kilheeney signed for Conference North side Droylsden. He left in March 2012 and signed for Chorley, scoring 2 goals on his debut at Worksop Town.

Between 2012 and 2018, Kilheeney had multiple spells at both Warrington Town and Droylsden.

References

1984 births
Living people
Exeter City F.C. players
Southport F.C. players
Mossley A.F.C. players
Radcliffe F.C. players
Burscough F.C. players
Droylsden F.C. players
Chorley F.C. players
English Football League players
People from Stockport
Warrington Town F.C. players
Association football defenders
English footballers